The 1974 Toronto Argonauts finished in fourth place in the Eastern Conference with a 6–9–1 record and failed to make the playoffs.

Offseason

Regular season

Standings

Schedule

Awards and honors
Sam Cvijanovich (LB), CFL's Most Outstanding Rookie Award
 Jim Stillwagon, Defense, CFL All-Stars

References

Toronto Argonauts seasons
1974 Canadian Football League season by team